Hardyville is an unincorporated community in Middlesex County, Virginia, United States. Hardyville has a post office with ZIP code 23070, which opened on October 14, 1922.

References

Unincorporated communities in Middlesex County, Virginia
Unincorporated communities in Virginia